This article lists political parties in Papua New Guinea.
Papua New Guinea has a multi-party system with numerous political parties, in which no one party often has a chance of gaining power alone, and parties must work with each other to form coalition governments. 

Political parties in the country are generally based on the personality of their leaders, rather than on any concrete ideology.

Currently registered parties

As of May 2019, the list of registered parties is:

Allegiance Party (ALG)
Christian Democratic Party (CDP)
 Coalition for Reform Party (CFRP)
Grassroot United Front Party (GRUF)
 Mapai Levites Party (MLP)
 Melanesian Alliance Party (MAP)
 Melanesian Liberal Party (MLP)
Model Nation Party (PKP)
 National Alliance Party (NA)
National Conservative Party (NCP)
Nations' Interest Party (NIP)
 New Generation Party (NGP)
 Our Development Party (ODP)
 Papua and Niugini Union Party (PANGU Party)
 Papua New Guinea Party (PNGP)
Paradise Kingdom Party (PKP)
 People's Action Party (PAP)
 People's Democratic Movement (PDM)
 People's First Party (PFP)
People's Freedom Party (UP)
 People's Labour Party (PLP)
 People's Movement for Change Party (PMFCP)
 People's National Congress (PNC)
 People's Party (PP)
 People's Progress Party (PPP)
 People's Resource Awareness Party (PRAP)
 People's United Assembly Party (PUAP)
 PNG Country Party (PNCP)
 PNG Destiny Party (PNGDP)
PNG First Party (PNGFP)
 PNG Greens Party (PNGGP)
PNG Human Rights Party (PNGHRP)
PNG National Party (PNGNP)
PNG One Nation Party (PONP)
PNG Socialist Party (PNGSP)
PNG Youths Party (PNGYP)
Republican Party (RP)
 Social Democratic Party (SDP)
SOM Pioneer Party (SOM)
 Star Alliance Party (SAP)
 Triumph Heritage Empowerment Party (THEP)
Trust PNG Party (TPNGP)
United Labour Party (PTU)
 United Party (UP)
 United Resources Party (URP)
Wantok in Godly Services Party (WINGS)

Defunct or non-registered parties

Parties active only in Bougainville

Bougainville Independence Movement
Bougainville Labour Party
Bougainville People's Congress
New Bougainville Party

See also
 Politics of Papua New Guinea
 List of political parties by country

References

External links
 Registry of Political Parties, Papua New Guinea
 Electoral Commission list of registered parties
 Explanation of party system in Papua New Guinea (note - somewhat out of date since the recent electoral reforms)

Papua New Guinea
 
Political parties
Papua New Guinea

Political parties